Montiel is a surname of Spanish origin. It comes from the area of southern Spain known as Campo de Montiel and the town located within the area called Montiel, in the Spanish province of Ciudad Real. People with the last name "Montiel" most likely have ancestors who came from the area.

Andrés Montiel (born 1975), Mexican stage and film actor
Arturo Montiel (born 1943), Mexican politician; governor of the State of Mexico 1999–2005
Dito Montiel (born 1965), American screenwriter, director, and musician
Fernando Montiel (born 1979), Mexican boxer
Gonzalo Montiel (born 1997), Argentine football player
José Montiel (born 1988), Paraguayan football player
José Esteban Montiel (born 1962), Spanish long-distance runner
Juan Montiel (born 1965), Uruguayan boxer
María José Montiel, Spanish operatic mezzo-soprano
Rafael Montiel (born 1981), Colombian road cyclist
Sara Montiel (1928–2013), Spanish singer and actress

See also
 

de:Montiel
es:Montiel (apellido)
fr:Montiel (homonymie)
it:Montiel (disambigua)#Persone